The Church of St Andrew in Thorne Coffin, Somerset, England, was built in the 14th century. It is a Grade II* listed building.

History

The church was built in the 14th century and restored in 1891. The north porch was built in 1613.

The parish is part of the Five Crosses benefice which includes Tintinhull, Chilthorne Domer, Yeovil Marsh, Thorne Coffin and Lufton, within the Diocese of Bath and Wells.

Architecture

The stone building has a tiled roof with a small bellcote. It consists of a one-bay chancel and two-bay nave, with small porches on the northern and southern sides.

The interior fittings, including the font are 18th century except the octagonal pulpit which dates from 1624.

See also  
 List of ecclesiastical parishes in the Diocese of Bath and Wells

References

Grade II* listed buildings in South Somerset
Grade II* listed churches in Somerset
Church of England church buildings in South Somerset